Muhammad Ajmal Cheema is a Pakistani politician who was the  Provincial Minister of Punjab for Bait-ul-Mal and Social Welfare, in office from 13 September 2018 to 19 July 2019. He was a member of the Provincial Assembly of the Punjab since August 2018 until May 2022.

Political career
He joined Pakistan tehreek e insaf in Election 2013 PP-97
He was elected to the Provincial Assembly of the Punjab as an independent candidate from Constituency PP-97 (Faisalabad-I) in 2018 Pakistani general election.

He joined Pakistan Tehreek-e-Insaf (PTI) following his election.

On 12 September 2018, he was inducted into the provincial Punjab cabinet of Chief Minister Sardar Usman Buzdar. On 13 September 2018, he was appointed as Provincial Minister of Punjab for Bait-ul-Mal and Social Welfare.

He was removed from the charge of provincial minister of Punjab for  Baitul Maal and Social Welfare on 19 July 2019.

He nowadays being accused of adultery/supported in adultery of the same Baitul Maal and Social Welfare underage girls he was custodian of.

He de-seated due to vote against party policy for Chief Minister of Punjab election  on 16 April 2022.

References

https://en.dailypakistan.com.pk/29-Nov-2019/scandal-of-underage-girls-marriages-at-state-run-lahore-s-shelter-home-surfaced

Living people
Pakistan Tehreek-e-Insaf MPAs (Punjab)
Provincial ministers of Punjab
Year of birth missing (living people)